Viktor Fyodorovich Bolkhovitinov (Виктор Фёдорович Болховитинов) (4 February 1899 – 29 January 1970) was a Soviet engineer and team-leader of the developers of the Bereznyak-Isayev BI-1 aircraft. He was also the lead designer of the Bolkhovitinov DB-A bomber named after him.

Bolkhovitinov was one of the first graduates of the Zhukovsky Academy. In 1934, he designed a modernized version of the Tupolev TB-3 bomber called the DB-A (long-range bomber of the academy). On August 12 of 1937, a DB-A attempted to fly over the North Pole to the USA, but the crew perished.

In 1937, he designed the "S" or "Spartak", a small sleek high-speed bomber with a long greenhouse canopy. Two contra-rotating props were driven by a pair of Klimov M-103 V-12 engines. Development of the aircraft and its planned variants was discontinued when the war began.

In 1940, Bolkhovitinov became head of his own experimental design bureau OKB-293. Based on a plane design by Bereznyak and Bolkhovitinov a few years earlier, and inspired by the attempt of NII-3 to build a ramjet powered plane, Bolkhovitinov decided to build a rocket-powered short-range interceptor. This was the BI-1.

In 1944, A.G. Kostakov, head of the State Institute of Reactive Technology (GIRT) was arrested. GIRT and Bolkhovitinov's OKB-293 were merged into the 'Scientific-Research Institute 1' (NII-1), a new jet propulsion research institute. Bolkhovitinov was head of research in NII-1. In 1946, his division was turned over to Matus Bisnovat, forming Zavod 293.

Bolkhovitinov received a doctorate in 1947 and became a full-time professor at the Zhukovsky Air Force Engineering Academy in 1949.

See also

Bereznyak-Isayev BI-1
Bolkhovitinov DB-A

Bibliography and further reading
 Gunston, Bill. “The Osprey Encyclopaedia of Russian Aircraft 1875–1995”. London, Osprey. 1995. 
 Taylor, Michael J.H. . " Jane's Encyclopedia of Aviation. Studio Editions. London. 1989. 

1899 births
1970 deaths
20th-century Russian engineers
Military personnel from Saratov
Recipients of the Order of Lenin
Recipients of the Order of the Red Banner
Recipients of the Order of the Red Banner of Labour
Recipients of the Order of the Red Star
Aircraft designers
Russian aerospace engineers
Russian major generals
Soviet aerospace engineers

Soviet major generals
Burials at Vvedenskoye Cemetery